Jeong Jin-bong (born 21 March 1943) is a South Korean basketball player. He competed in the men's tournament at the 1964 Summer Olympics.

References

External links
 

1943 births
Living people
South Korean men's basketball players
Olympic basketball players of South Korea
Basketball players at the 1964 Summer Olympics
Place of birth missing (living people)